Paul Watchorn (born 19 July 1958) is an Irish folk musician and former professional snooker player. He previously played with Derek Warfield. He currently plays with the band The Dublin Legends who were members of The Dubliners, a band in which his older brother Patsy Watchorn was a member. Watchorn was a professional snooker player from 1982–1995, retiring after 13 seasons as a professional.

References

Irish snooker players
Irish musicians
Musicians from Dublin (city)
Living people
1958 births